Omar Ali Juma (26 June 1941 in Chake-Chake, Pemba, Zanzibar – 4 July 2001 in Dar es Salaam, Tanzania) was Chief Minister of Zanzibar from 25 January 1988 to October 1995. From 1995 to 2001, he served as Vice President of Tanzania.

Life and career 
Attended primary school education between 1949 and 1957 at Chake-Chake Boys' School.  From 1957 to 1960 he was at Euan Smith Secondary School (now Haile Selassie Secondary School) where he attained an Ordinary Level School Certificate. In 1960 he joined the Moscow State University and was awarded with an Advanced Level Certificate in 1962 and seven years later, at the same college, he attained a bachelor's degree in Veterinary Medicine and Surgery. For a year from 1969 he was at Cairo University for a post graduate certificate in Animal Production and Health. In 1976 he attended a one-year course for a Postgraduate Diploma in Tropical Veterinary Medicine at the University of Edinburgh. In 1982 he joined the University of Florida in the United States for a short course in Veterinary Science and two years later he attended University of Reading for a Livestock Economics course from which he joined the Kivukoni Ideological College in Tanzania.

Appointments
 1967-1969 Assistant Veterinary Officer, Zanzibar
 1969-1970 Veterinary Officer in charge of Pemba
 1970-1971 Senior Veterinary Officer
 1971-1972 Livestock Officer
 1972-1978 Chief Veterinary Officer
 1978-1984 Director, Livestock Department
 1984-1988 Principal Secretary, Ministry of Agriculture and Livestock Development
 1988-1995 Chief Minister, Zanzibar Revolutionary Government
 1995-2001 Elected Vice President of the United Republic of Tanzania

References 

1941 births
2001 deaths
Tanzanian Muslims
Vice-presidents of Tanzania
Chief Ministers of Zanzibar
Chama Cha Mapinduzi politicians
Zanzibari politicians
Pemba Island
Alumni of the University of Edinburgh

Moscow State University alumni
University of Florida alumni
Alumni of the University of Reading